Paavo Paatrikki Aarniokoski (5 April 1893 – 17 October 1961) was a Finnish farmer and politician, born in Kankaanpää. He was a member of the Parliament of Finland from 1933 to 1945, representing the Social Democratic Party of Finland (SDP).

References

1893 births
1961 deaths
People from Kankaanpää
People from Turku and Pori Province (Grand Duchy of Finland)
Social Democratic Party of Finland politicians
Members of the Parliament of Finland (1933–36)
Members of the Parliament of Finland (1936–39)
Members of the Parliament of Finland (1939–45)
Finnish people of World War II
Finnish farmers